Caimpiyarganj is a constituency of the Uttar Pradesh Legislative Assembly covering the city of Caimpiyarganj in the Gorakhpur district of Uttar Pradesh, India. It is one of five assembly constituencies in the Gorakhpur Lok Sabha constituency. Since 2008, this assembly constituency is numbered 320 amongst 403 constituencies.

Member of the Legislative Assembly

Election results

2022

2017

The MLA is Bharatiya Janta Party candidate Fateh Bahadur Singh who won in the 2017 Uttar Pradesh Legislative Assembly election defeating Indian National Congress candidate Chinta Yadav by a margin of 32,854 votes.

References

External links
 

Assembly constituencies of Uttar Pradesh
Politics of Gorakhpur district